Rivularia is the scientific name of two genera of organisms and may refer to:

Rivularia (cyanobacteria), a genus of cyanobacteria in the family Rivulariaceae
Rivularia (gastropod), a genus of snails in the family Viviparidae